10th Anniversary: Fantasia in Tokyo Dome (stylized as KODA KUMI 10th Anniversary ～FANTASIA～ in TOKYO DOME) is the 11th live DVD released by Japanese singer Koda Kumi, released on March 18, 2011.

Information
On December 5, 2010, Koda Kumi held a concert to celebrate 10 years as an artist and showcased 46 songs. This was her second performance at Tokyo Dome - her first being her Black Cherry Tour.

The DVD includes a 30-minute making video and backstage footage at Tokyo Dome Live. The limited edition DVD came with a replica staff pass, which mimicked the passes used by the tour staff.

Track listing

DVD1
"Butterfly"
"show girl"
"Cherry Girl"
"Ima Sugu Hoshii"
"Lollipop"
"Crazy 4 U"<Interlude Movie 1>
"Selfish"
"Ningyo-hime"
"We Will Rock You / real Emotion / BUT / Freaky"<Interlude Movie 2>
"Ai no Uta"
"Rain / Promise / Anata Dake ga / come back"
"0-ji Mae no Tsunderella"
"Take Back"
"Moon Crying"
"Ai no Kotoba"<Interlude Movie 3>
"Koi no Tsubomi"
"Inside Fishbowl"
"Gentle Words"
"Someday"
"Lick me♥"

DVD2
<Encore>
"Be My Baby"
"Megumi no Hito"
"Universe"
"Dance Part"
"It's all Love!"<Double Encore>
"Come With Me / Lady Go! / So Into You / Won't Be Long / Taboo / Trust Your Love / Chase / Cutie Honey / No Regret / love across the ocean / Come Over
"Suki de, Suki de, Suki de."
"Wind"
"walk"
"Bonus Pictures from Tokyo Dome and Making Video"

Chart history

References

2011 video albums
Koda Kumi video albums
Live video albums
Albums recorded at the Tokyo Dome